Le Haut-Saint-Laurent (Upper Saint Lawrence) is a regional county municipality in southwestern Quebec, Canada, in the Montérégie region. Its seat is in Huntingdon. It is named for the Saint Lawrence River, which forms its western and its northwestern boundaries.

History 
The RCM was formed on January 1, 1982, from most of historic Huntingdon County.

Subdivisions
There are 13 subdivisions and one native reserve within the RCM:

Cities & Towns (1)
 Huntingdon

Municipalities (8)
 Elgin
 Franklin
 Hinchinbrooke
 Howick
 Ormstown
 Saint-Anicet
 Saint-Chrysostome
 Sainte-Barbe

Parishes (1)
 Très-Saint-Sacrement

Townships (3)
 Dundee
 Godmanchester
 Havelock

Native Reserves (1)
 Akwesasne

Demographics

Population

Language

Transportation

Access Routes
Highways and numbered routes that run through the municipality, including external routes that start or finish at the county border:

 Autoroutes
 None

 Principal Highways
 
 

 Secondary Highways
 
 
 
 

 External Routes

See also
 List of regional county municipalities and equivalent territories in Quebec

References

External links
 

 
Census divisions of Quebec